Go to Hell!! is a 1997 Australian adult animated comedy film directed, written, produced, and animated entirely by Ray Nowland, making it one of the only feature-length films animated by a single person.  The film re-imagines history in a world where God is actually an alien called "G.D.", who wiped out the dinosaurs and replaced them with apes from his own planet (which eventually evolve into humans), with the Devil being G.D.'s son (called "Little Red"), who appears throughout history in an attempt to thwart G.D.'s plans.

Reception
Go to Hell!! has received very limited distribution, despite having been aired on national television station SBS in Australia.  Despite this, the film has received positive critical reception.  In AllMovie, Robert Firsching awarded the film 3½ out of 5 stars, describing it as "an impressive attempt to completely rewrite the history of the universe in less time than it takes to train a Pokémon."  Steven Puchalski in Shock Cinema also praised Go to Hell!!, stating that it "crams a wealth of imagination into only 73 minutes." Underground Animation recommended the film to "anyone that’s into weird fucked up animation, adult fans of ‘Blinky Bill’ or anyone interested in the history of underground, solo or Australian animation." Screen Australia described the film as "hilariously shocking".

References

External links
 
 
Watch full movie at https://www.youtube.com/watch?v=zvomoCj9eeA

1997 films
1997 comedy films
1997 animated films
Australian independent films
Australian comedy films
Australian animated feature films
Australian adult animated films
Animated comedy films
Fiction about God
Religious comedy films
1997 independent films
1990s Australian animated films
1990s English-language films